Carrillo may refer to:

Places
 Carrillo (canton), the fifth division of Guanacaste Province, Costa Rica
 Puerto Carrillo, a small town in Guanacaste, Costa Rica
 Carrillo Airport, which serves Puerto Carrillo
 Carrillo (beach), a beach adjacent to Puerto Carrillo, Costa Rica
 Leo Carrillo State Park, a beach in Thousand Oaks, California, USA

Other uses
 Carrillo (crater), a lunar crater
 Carrillo (surname), including a list of people with the surname
 House of Carrillo, a large Spanish noble house that traces its origins from the ancient Kingdom of Castille
 USS Carrillo (ID-1406), a United States Navy cargo ship in commission from 1918 to 1919

See also
 Carillo, surname